Alderman Canal West is a one hectare Local Nature Reserve in Ipswich in Suffolk. It is owned by Ipswich Borough Council and managed by the Greenways Countryside Project.

Paths run along the canal and through reedbeds. There is also grassland with tall herbs, and the canal bank has rare wetland flora. Birds include common kingfishers and reed buntings.

There is access from Sir Alf Ramsey Way.

See also
 Alderman Canal East

References

Local Nature Reserves in Suffolk
Canals in Suffolk